Luís António Soares Cassamá, known as Bambo (born 22 October 1974) is a former Portuguese football player of Bissau-Guinean descent.

Club career
He made his professional debut in the Primeira Liga for Boavista on 30 August 1992 as a late substitute in a 4–1 victory against Paços de Ferreira.

International
He represented Portugal at the 1992 UEFA European Under-18 Championship, 1993 UEFA European Under-18 Championship and the 1993 FIFA World Youth Championship.

References

1974 births
Sportspeople from Bissau
Portuguese sportspeople of Bissau-Guinean descent
Bissau-Guinean emigrants to Portugal
Living people
Portuguese footballers
Portugal youth international footballers
Boavista F.C. players
Primeira Liga players
U.D. Leiria players
C.F. Estrela da Amadora players
S.C. Farense players
F.C. Felgueiras players
Liga Portugal 2 players
C.D. Nacional players
A.D. Esposende players
Associação Naval 1º de Maio players
Grenoble Foot 38 players
Portuguese expatriate footballers
Expatriate footballers in France
Association football forwards